Yatir Winery is an Israeli winery in Tel Arad, Israel. Yatir’s vineyards are situated on a hill 900 meters above sea level on the outskirts of Yatir Forest.

Planting of the vineyards commenced in 1997. Eran Goldwasser, a graduate of Adelaide University, Australia, is the chief winemaker. The company is owned by Carmel Winery. As of 2012 annual production is about 150,000 bottles.

The winery began producing on two levels: Yatir and Yatir Forest, the latter being the winery's flagship series. In 2004, Yatir introduced a Sauvignon Blanc wine and the following year a single-varietal Cabernet Sauvignon and Shiraz. In 2006, it came out with a varietal Viognier.

Yatir's wine has received accolades from critics such as Robert Parker. It is the first Israeli wine to be listed in the main selection of Selfridges in London.

On the grounds of the winery, 180 ancient wine presses have been discovered

See also
Israeli wine
Israeli cuisine

References

External links
Official site

Wineries of Israel
Food and drink companies established in 2000